Olga Markova (born August 6, 1968) is a retired long-distance runner from Russia, who set the world's best year performance in 1992, when she won the Boston Marathon, clocking 2:23:43. In 1993, she defended her victory in Boston in 2:25:27.

Achievements

References
 alltime-athletics

1968 births
Living people
Russian female long-distance runners
Boston Marathon female winners
20th-century Russian women
21st-century Russian women